Bang Boet (also written as Bang Berd;) is a coastal area of the Gulf of Thailand belonging to Sai Thong Sub-district, Bang Saphan Noi District of Prachuap Khiri Khan Province and Pak Khlong Sub-district, Pathio District of Chumphon province.

Its name Bang Boet, literally translated as "place of bombs", because in World War II it was a target that was bombed by the Allies. In the past, Bang Boet was known for farming watermelons on the Prince Sithiporn Kridakara's cultivation. He originally brought the seed from the USA. These watermelons were large in size, sweet and crispy, known as Bang Boet Watermelon.

Bang Boet is a small curving bay with a clean beach and water. It also has a hill of the same name, Khao Bang Boet, which is a notable feature. Half of the hill is on land, and the other half went down into the sea. Half way north of Prachuap Khiri Khan, and the other half to the south, is of Chumphon. The southern part of the hill has a canal. The canal is divided between provinces of Prachuap Khiri Khan and Chumphon.

Not far from the beach and hill is home to the Sithiporn Kridakara Research Station and Museum that exhibits his work and biography. 

Beside the road along the station to the south at Tham Thong Beach is the only remaining sand dune in Thailand. The growing plants are unusual, similar to desert plants. It is maintained by the Chumphon Royal Development Project, a royal project of H.M.King Bhumibol Adulyadej (Rama IX).

In addition, there is also a jetty called Bang Boet Fish Marketing that extends into the sea. Snorkelling is a common activity.

Bang Boet can be reached by two train stations Bang Saphan Noi and Huai Sak of the State Railway of Thailand (SRT), whose Southern Line runs through the area.

References

External links
Ban Boet Beach

Tourist attractions in Chumphon province
Tourist attractions in Prachuap Khiri Khan province
Beaches of Thailand
Gulf of Thailand
Neighbourhoods in Thailand